GGF may refer to:
 Gandhi Global Family, a peace organisation
 Georgian Cargo Airlines Africa, a defunct Senegalese airline
 Global Gaming Factory X, a defunct Swedish advertising and software company
 Global Grid Forum
 Grant Municipal Airport, in Nebraska, United States